Felipe Anderson Pereira Gomes (born 15 April 1993), known as Felipe Anderson, is a Brazilian professional footballer who plays as an attacking midfielder for Serie A club Lazio. He has previously played for Santos, West Ham United and Porto, and was also capped by the Brazil national team twice.

Early and personal life 

Born Santa Maria, Distrito Federal, Brazil, Felipe Anderson grew up the youngest of five siblings. His upbringing was poor, and he had to borrow football boots from his friends to play.

Club career

Early career
Felipe Anderson began his career in Associação 14 Companhia de Polícia Militar Independente (CPMIND), in his hometown of Santa Maria at 6 years old. In 2006, he was moved to Federal FC, and later to Sport Clube Recreativo Gaminha FC. After some impressive performances on the club, he was moved to Paraná to play for Astral EC, finishing the year. In 2007, he was moved to Coritiba youth side, and then in 2007 summer he was moved to Santos.

Santos
Felipe Anderson then played for Santos' youth categories, and was promoted to the senior squad following a rash of injuries in October 2010. He began training with the senior side and signed a professional contract until July 2013. He made his debut for Santos on 6 October 2010 as a 90th-minute substitute in a 3–0 win against Fluminense.

His first goal of his footballing career came on 11 February 2011, when Felipe came off the bench at half time to replace Keirrison against Noroeste, scoring from a long range shot in the 70th minute. On 7 September, he scored his first league goal, against Avaí. In November, he signed a new contract with Santos, running until 2016.

In his following season, Felipe Anderson had more chances in first team alongside Neymar, due to Ganso's injuries and Elano's poor form (both players left Santos in the middle of the season). On 9 February 2012, he scored his first goal of the season, against Botafogo-SP.

On the 31 January 2013, the agreed transfer to the Italian club Lazio for €7.5 million failed due to late arrival of a necessary international fax from Brazil to close the deal.

Lazio

On 25 June 2013, Lazio agreed a €7.8 million fee with Santos, and Felipe Anderson signed a five-year deal worth €800,000 a year. Santos received 50% of the transfer sum and third party owner Doyen Sports would get the rest. Lazio's sporting director Igli Tare criticised Doyen Sports for numerous times delaying the transfer, "It will remain in history as the most paradoxical and shocking negotiations I have ever been a part of", said Tare. "These third party owners changed their minds continually. When we had everything decided, they would start from scratch two hours later. It all happened for a full week, so it felt like being in the Twilight Zone."

2014–15 season
In his second season at the club, Felipe Anderson achieved 10 goals and nine assists in 27 games across all competitions by April 2015. This included the concluding goal as Lazio defeated Varese 3–0 in the fourth round of the season's Coppa Italia, and an assist in both legs of the tournament's semi-final against holders Napoli, the one in the second leg providing the winning goal by Senad Lulić. In March 2015, Felipe Anderson signed a contract extension at Lazio, renewing his contract until June 2020. He played the full 120 minutes of the Coppa Italia final on 20 May 2015, a 1–2 loss to Juventus.

2015–16 season
In July, it was announced that Felipe Anderson would not be wearing the number 7 shirt that he had worn in his previous season with Lazio, but that he would instead be awarded the number 10 shirt. On 8 August, Felipe Anderson appeared in Lazio's 2–0 defeat to Juventus in the 2015 Supercoppa Italiana. On 23 September 2015, Felipe Anderson scored his first goal of the season in a 2–0 victory against Genoa. After scoring the second goal in a 3–1 Europa League win against Rosenborg on 22 October 2015, Felipe Anderson scored twice in a 3–0 win against Torino three days later. In February 2016, Lazio publicly denied rumours that Manchester United had agreed a transfer for Felipe Anderson. Felipe Anderson finished Lazio's season with nine goals in all competitions, coming runner-up to Antonio Candreva in Lazio's scoring charts for the season.

2016–17 season
After being the subject of reported interest from Chelsea during the summer, Felipe Anderson remained with Lazio. On 26 October 2016, Felipe Anderson scored his first goal of the season, in a 4–1 win against Cagliari. On 7 May 2017, Felipe Anderson scored a penalty in a 7–3 win against Sampdoria. Lazio secured qualification for the Europa League at the end of the season, with Felipe Anderson scoring five goals in all competitions.

2017–18 season
During the 2017–18 season Felipe Anderson's form suffered numerous setbacks. A falling out with manager Simone Inzaghi after a 2–1 defeat to Genoa in February 2018 coupled with a knee injury that kept him out from August to December 2017 restricted Felipe Anderson to just nine Serie A starts for the season. On 20 May 2018, Felipe Anderson scored in his final game for Lazio in a 3–2 defeat to Inter Milan in a game that saw the victors qualify for the Champions League over Lazio.

West Ham United

On 15 July 2018, Felipe Anderson signed for West Ham United for a reported transfer fee of £36 million. The fee surpassed the previous record paid by the club, set with the £22 million signing of Issa Diop earlier in the same transfer window.

2018–19 season

Felipe Anderson made his first appearance for West Ham in a 3–1 pre-season friendly victory against Aston Villa on 25 July 2018, in which he combined with Arthur Masuaku to set up West Ham's second goal of the match, scored by Marko Arnautović. He made his full debut on 12 August 2018 in a 4–0 defeat against Liverpool. On 29 September 2018, Felipe Anderson scored his first Premier League goal for West Ham with a back heeled finish in a 3–1 home win against Manchester United. Anderson scored nine league goals in his first season of English football, helping West Ham finish 10th in the Premier League.

2019–20 season

The 2019–20 season was a difficult one for Anderson as he found the back of the net just once in a 4–0 win over AFC Bournemouth on 1 January 2020. The departure of manager Manuel Pellegrini saw reduced minutes for the Brazilian as he battled inconsistent form. The goal against Bournemouth signalled changing fortunes, however, a troublesome back injury saw Anderson fall out of new manager David Moyes' plans. Following the interruption of the 2019–20 Premier League season due to the COVID-19 pandemic, Anderson only made three appearances out of a total of nine games following the restart to the season.

Loan to Porto
On 6 October 2020, Felipe Anderson joined Portuguese club Porto on a season-long loan. It was a widely anticipated move for the out-of-form Brazilian to gain much needed confidence and playing time.  On arrival at the club, Anderson said he was "fulfilling a dream" to play in both the UEFA Champions League and Primeira Liga whilst also insisting that he will still attempt to regain a starting spot at West Ham the following season. He made his Porto debut on 17 October, replacing Luis Díaz in the 59th minute of a 2–2 draw at Sporting CP.

Throughout the season, Anderson only made five Primeira Liga appearances - largely put down to a sour relationship with manager Sérgio Conceição. In October, he suggested Anderson "needs to work hard" and there were many indications Anderson was signed against the manager's wishes. At the end of the season, Anderson seemed to criticise the manager stating that he applied himself from the beginning but "wasn't given many opportunities to play."

Return to Lazio
On 16 July 2021, Anderson returned to Lazio on a permanent transfer for an undisclosed fee. He had played 73 games for West Ham scoring 12 goals.

International career
Felipe Anderson was one of seven stand-by players named by coach Dunga for Brazil's squad at the 2015 Copa América in Chile. He made his debut in a warm-up match against Mexico on 7 June of that year, playing the final seven minutes in place of Fred in a 2–0 victory at Allianz Parque in São Paulo.

In June 2016, Felipe Anderson was included in Brazil's squad for the 2016 Summer Olympics on home soil by the Olympic side's manager Rogério Micale. On 20 August, he appeared in the final of the tournament against Germany at the Maracanã in Rio; Brazil won the match 5–4 on penalties following a 1–1 draw to capture its first Olympic gold medal in men's football.
Anderson was recalled to the Brazil squad in February 2019, for the first time since 2015, for two friendly matches.

Style of play

A quick, well-rounded, and technically gifted midfielder, with a slender and diminutive but long-limbed physique, Felipe Anderson is considered a promising and talented young player. He is predominantly known for his pace, and is regarded as one of the fastest players in the modern game; although not imposing physically or in the air, he also possesses good ball control, quick feet, and excellent dribbling skills, which allow him to beat opponents in one on one situations. A tactically versatile player, he is capable of playing in several different positions due to his wide range of skills, high work-rate, and ability to both create and score goals: he has been used as a forward or as a central midfield playmaker, but has most frequently been deployed as either a winger or an attacking midfielder, due to his offensive movement and tendency to operate between the lines; he is capable of playing on either flank or through the centre of the pitch, due to his ability to cut into the middle and strike on goal, or move out to the wing to provide accurate crosses to teammates in the area. In addition to his speed, stamina, creativity and technical ability, he is known for his eye for goal, and is gifted with a powerful and accurate shot from distance with either foot, despite being naturally right-footed; he is also an accurate set-piece and penalty kick taker. He can also serve as an assist-man due to his creative ability, vision, dead-ball delivery, and eye for the final pass.

Career statistics

Club

International

Honours
Source:

Santos
Copa Libertadores: 2011
Recopa Sudamericana: 2012

Lazio
Supercoppa Italiana: 2017

Brazil U23
Olympic Gold Medal: 2016

References

External links

 Profile at Santos FC 
 
 

1993 births
Living people
Sportspeople from Federal District (Brazil)
Brazilian footballers
Brazilian expatriate footballers
Brazil youth international footballers
Footballers at the 2011 Pan American Games
Santos FC players
S.S. Lazio players
West Ham United F.C. players
FC Porto players
Campeonato Brasileiro Série A players
Expatriate footballers in Italy
Expatriate footballers in England
Expatriate footballers in Portugal
Brazilian expatriate sportspeople in Italy
Brazilian expatriate sportspeople in England
Brazilian expatriate sportspeople in Portugal
Association football midfielders
Brazil international footballers
Olympic footballers of Brazil
Footballers at the 2016 Summer Olympics
Copa Libertadores-winning players
Olympic gold medalists for Brazil
Olympic medalists in football
Medalists at the 2016 Summer Olympics
Premier League players
Primeira Liga players
Pan American Games competitors for Brazil